Robert Evander McNair Sr. (December 14, 1923November 17, 2007) was the 108th governor of South Carolina, a Democrat, who served from 1965 to 1971.

Early life and education
McNair was born in Cades, a town in Williamsburg County, South Carolina. In 1944, he married Josephine Robinson of Allendale, South Carolina. He served in the U.S. Navy during World War II, having been awarded a Bronze Star. After the war, he completed his bachelor's degree in 1947 at the University of South Carolina, where he was a member of the Euphradian Society. He received a law degree at the same school in 1948.

While attending USC, McNair served as the first governor of the South Carolina Student Legislature, was initiated into the Kappa Sigma fraternity.

Early career 
He went on to practice law in Moncks Corner and Allendale, South Carolina. from which he was elected in 1950 to the South Carolina House of Representatives. He was elected lieutenant governor in 1962, then succeeded Donald S. Russell in 1965 when Russell resigned with the understanding that McNair would appoint him to a then-vacant United States Senate seat.

Governor of South Carolina 

McNair won the 1966 general election over State Representative Joseph O. Rogers, Jr., of Manning, the first Republican gubernatorial nominee in South Carolina in the 20th century.

Orangeburg Massacre 
McNair was governor during the Orangeburg Massacre in 1968, which he blamed on Black Power advocates, and called it a stain on the state's good record in civil rights. In 2006, McNair, decades after leaving office, McNair admitted responsibility for the deaths of the three Black civil rights activists killed in Orangeburg.

He said it was "one of the saddest days in the history of South Carolina." Following this, McNair became much more proactive in working to defuse tensions that were present during the integration of the public schools.

National politics 
In 1968, McNair was considered as a potential running mate for Democratic nominee Hubert Humphrey. At the 1968 Democratic National Convention, McNair served as chair of the Southern Governors Conference.

Death and legacy 
After his term as governor, he originated McNair Law Firm, P.A. in Columbia. He was inducted into the South Carolina Hall of Fame, and awarded an honorary doctorate in 2005 by Francis Marion University, a school which he signed into creation while governor in 1970.  On May 21, 2009, McNair was inducted into the South Carolina Business Hall of Fame.

McNair was diagnosed with a cancerous brain tumor during a checkup on September 28, 2007, from which he died in Charleston on November 17. The following week, on November 25, 2007, the late Governor McNair's widow, former First Lady of South Carolina, Josephine Robinson McNair, died at age 84.

On December 19, 2007, about a month after her parents died, Claudia Crawford McNair died at age 50. She was from Jamestown in Berkeley County, South Carolina. On January 22, 2008, his son, Robert E. McNair, Jr., of Columbia, died at age 60 after a seven-year battle with cancer.

References

External links
SC Governors – Robert Evander McNair, 1965–1971 from the South Carolina Information Highway
Robert McNair: In His Own Words Documents from the Robert E. McNair Papers at South Carolina Political Collections
Governor Robert E. McNair Collection at the South Carolina Department of Archives & History (RG 551000)

|-

|-

|-

1923 births
2007 deaths
20th-century American politicians
United States Navy personnel of World War II
Deaths from brain cancer in the United States
Deaths from cancer in South Carolina
Democratic Party governors of South Carolina
Lawyers from Columbia, South Carolina
Democratic Party members of the South Carolina House of Representatives
People from Williamsburg County, South Carolina
Politicians from Columbia, South Carolina
South Carolina lawyers
University of South Carolina alumni
University of South Carolina trustees
20th-century American lawyers